Scene7 is an American on-demand rich media software company that provides document hosting and interactive publishing services such as online catalogs, targeted email, video, and image management. Retailers use the company's services to showcase products on their websites and to allow customers to interact with the products. Scene7's technology allows users to manipulate product images by zooming in and rotating products, simulating the inspection of merchandise in retail stores.

The company, founded as a division of Autodesk, created a room decoration computer software called Picture This Home in the mid-1990s. The division was sold to Broderbund in 1998, then spun off as a company called GoodHome.com in June 1999. After GoodHome.com failed to become profitable, it was reorganized and renamed Scene7. It formally launched on January 23, 2001, and focused on helping companies prepare interactive advertisements for consumers. Adobe Systems acquired Scene7 in 2007 for an undisclosed sum.

Company
A subsidiary of Adobe Systems, Scene7 provides document hosting and interactive publishing services, typically charging clients to convert catalog print files to interactive web pages. The company does most of its business in North America. Its primary competitors for dynamic imaging services and technology are RichFX and LiquidPixels. Scene7 products rely on several Adobe products, including Adobe Photoshop, Adobe InDesign, Adobe Flash, Adobe Illustrator, and Adobe Flex; this relationship existed before Adobe purchased the company. Scene7 does not maintain any servers to host its services; instead, it uses a "pay as you grow" program that only requires it to pay for the resources that it uses.

Scene7's clients include the companies Sears, Lands' End, Harrods, Macy's, Office Depot, Levi Strauss & Co., La-Z-Boy, and QVC. In 2001, Scene7 agreed to develop home design and landscaping software for Individual Software for $50 million. High-end casual clothing retailer Anthropologie has used Scene7's services to create and deploy online catalogs for its e-commerce website since November 9, 2004. The retailer implemented Scene7's Dynamic Imaging service to let customers zoom in on products, similar to how merchandise is inspected in retail stores. The Harrods department store signed an agreement with Scene7 on June 24, 2005, to use Scene7's imaging and catalog system on the store's website. This required Harrods to convert all its printed material to a digital format for Internet use.

On October 20, 2005, web agency Logan Tod announced that it had partnered with Scene7 to offer new features on its e-commerce websites. These include Scene7's Dynamic Imaging service, which allows visitors to zoom in on products to see details; this feature, Logan Tod claimed, helps to drive purchase decisions. Fathead, a company that builds and sells wall graphics, uses Scene7's services on its website to generate images and to allow visitors to layer images on top of each other dynamically. National Business Furniture, a furniture retailer based in Milwaukee, Wisconsin, implemented Scene7's technology on November 3, 2008, allowing visitors to dynamically change the colors of product images on the company's website.

History

GoodHome.com (1995−2000)

The company began as a development team that created software called Picture This Home in the mid-1990s for Autodesk in San Rafael, California. The program allowed people to virtually preview room decoration projects before any work began. Its users can create virtual rooms, change walls and arrange furniture, and create photo-realistic renderings of completed designs. Picture This Home was awarded the Good Housekeeping Seal of Approval. In 1998, the software and its team of 40 developers were sold to Broderbund, which was owned by The Learning Company, a subsidiary of Mattel Inc. Broderbund eventually spun Picture This Home off as a company called GoodHome.com in June 1999 with Doug Mack as its CEO. The company received $30 million in venture capital from Hearst Interactive Media.

Mack noted that before Broderbund spun off GoodHome.com as a separate company, there was a "big culture clash" between the established company and the new media division. He said that companies such as Broderbund were so concerned with established business that smaller, newer divisions found it hard to receive sufficient attention and bandwidth. He praised Broderbund's decision to spin the company off as a separate entity: "We would have never been able to build our Web business if we were not in a separate building with separate funding." Mack observed that newer companies like GoodHome.com rarely had any problem in hiring new employees because of the opportunity for Internet companies to grow quickly into "the next Amazon.com".

In September 1999, GoodHome.com merged with Alexandria, Virginia-based nHabit.com, a rival company, for an undisclosed sum. After the merger, GoodHome.com was assured that it would grow quickly; the merger also added the Internet service provider America Online to GoodHome.com's portfolio as a client. Ten weeks after forming a business plan, GoodHome.com officially launched on September 29, 1999 with offices in San Rafael and New York City, New York, and Roger Horchow was assigned as its chairman. The company used the slogan "A beautiful home. It was never this easy," and focused on selling furniture and other home items, spending $20 million on advertisements in its first year. Mack decided that the company should target women, since "women make 80 percent of decorating decisions." The company built a home furnishings portal to compete with the websites Living.com and Furniture.com, which both went bankrupt in 2000. In April 2000, GoodHome.com's monthly sales topped $1 million; the company's goal was to be profitable within two to three years.

One of the website's biggest attractions was its virtual decorating service that let customers see how certain features such as the paint, upholstery fabric, rugs, and pillows would look before a purchase. When considering why this service was so popular, Mack noted that consumers usually feel more confident in a purchase when there are few unknowns. At the time, selling products over the Internet was not a popular concept outside the United States, but Mack was confident in expanding GoodHome.com's portfolio to include foreign companies: "We're already getting so many requests from companies about expanding our website abroad... I see this happening quickly within the next few years."

GoodHome.com encountered difficulties in running its business in 2000, when several other companies that offered similar services launched. The increasing demand for online catalog services, considered a phenomenon, was dubbed the "hottest thing since sliced bread" by an analyst from technology research firm Forrester Research, which estimated that roughly $500 million was invested in home furnishing websites from 1999 to 2000. It became difficult for consumers to decide which service provided better quality; a business owner commented, "You can't tell the difference in quality between something that's $3,000 and something that's $10,000." GoodHome.com, which had offered free shipping, phased out the feature on July 15, 2000, in favor of "heavily subsidized rates". To compete with new companies, GoodHome.com also introduced new features such as a "floor planning" feature to allow website visitors build an electronic version of their rooms, then drag in furnishings to see how they fit.

Reorganization (2001−2007)
After spending several years operating at a loss, GoodHome.com reorganized as Scene7, which formally launched on January 23, 2001, with $15 million raised from investors that included Hearst Interactive Media. The new company focused on helping companies prepare interactive advertisements for consumers. Mack, the Broderbund executive who had decided to spin off the company, reflected on the decision to reorganize and relaunch: "We got a year into [the initial GoodHome scheme] and the whole B2C (business-to-consumer) market tanked, and we realized we could not build a successful business as a portal [...] But the whole time we kept having people approach us to license the technology [to create virtual catalogs], and finally a light bulb went off when we realized we were sitting on top of a great technology we could sell." Scene7 raised a round of financing on July 12, 2001, that totaled $11.3 million, which helped stabilize the company. The deal was led by venture capitalists from several firms, including Louis Bacon's Moore Capital Management and Xcelera of the Cayman Islands, with cash investments from Cooley Godward and Perkins Coie. After the latest round of financing, Mack planned for Scene7 to have 15 clients and a burn rate, or negative cash flow, of less than $700,000 a month, stating, "What we learned was to stick to your strategy, and don't get nervous when the competition is adopting a strategy to spend their way to victory." At the time, the company's revenues were well below its peak of $1 million a month, but Mack intended to increase revenues past that point in a few months.

Scene7 moved from San Rafael to Hamilton Landing in Novato, California in September 2002 to accommodate more employees. On July 9, 2003, the company acquired all of the assets of workflow provider and advertising software company Engage for $1.2 million and assumed its $650,000 debt after Engage filed for Chapter 11 bankruptcy. Engage was the parent company of both Cascade and MidSystems, which were two of the first companies that tried to automate prepress production for newspapers and large printers. On August 15, 2003, Scene7 acquired its top competitor, TrueSpectra of San Mateo, for an undisclosed amount of cash and stock. On June 15, 2004, Scene7 raised $7.5 million in another round of financing, led by home shopping company QVC with some of Scene7's existing investors. At the same time, Jeffrey Branman, President of Interactive Technology Partners at QVC, and David Rubenstein, co-founder of the private equity firm The Carlyle Group, joined Scene7's board of directors, which was composed of James Caccavo of Moore Capital, Andrew Wright of RealNetworks, and Mack.

Since the early 2000s, the company's growth has been fueled by an increase in broadband Internet access, which loads virtual catalogs faster than dial-up Internet access. When catalogs first appeared online in the late 1990s, the graphics took too long to load. After high-speed Internet access became more popular, virtual catalogs quickly grew to become a popular feature of online stores. In addition to faster Internet connectivity, a study in 2000 noted that an online presence for brick and mortar businesses increased offline sales by an average of 27%. Mack also pointed out that having more product information disseminated helps play a role in increasing sales: "We have the ability to provide consistent information... One of the advantages of selling furniture online is the hyperscript; you always have the original specifications on a product."

Subsidiary of Adobe (2007)

Scene7 was acquired by Adobe Systems on May 31, 2007, for an undisclosed sum. At that time, Scene7 had 80 employees, most of whom were transferred from Scene7's former headquarters in Novato, California to Adobe's offices in San Francisco, California. Mack joined Adobe as its vice president of Creative Solutions Services. Scene7 was added to Adobe's product line as a hosted service to help boost Adobe's overall services strategy, especially its software as a service efforts, and because Scene7 was a great fit due to its heavy usage of Adobe products.

Adobe plans to integrate Scene7's products into Adobe LiveCycle, the company's suite of server software products, at an unspecified time. The Scene7 brand will continue to be used, but it will "eventually be replaced with the Adobe brand". Denmark-based YaWah, a dynamic imaging software company, was acquired by Adobe on September 26, 2008, to help expand Scene7 globally.

References

Mass media companies of the United States
2007 mergers and acquisitions
Companies based in San Rafael, California
Discontinued Adobe software